Sisco is a commune in the Haute-Corse department of France on the island of Corsica.
It takes its name from the Ruisseau de Sisco, which flows through the commune and enters the Tyrrhenian Sea in the village of Sisco.

Geography

Climate
Sisco has a hot-summer mediterranean climate (Köppen climate classification Csa).

Population

See also
Communes of the Haute-Corse department

References

Communes of Haute-Corse